Joseph Karl Szakacs (born 1982) is an Australian politician and trade unionist. He is a Labor Party member of the South Australian Legislative Assembly, representing the electoral district of Cheltenham since the 2019 Cheltenham by-election.

Szakacs has served as the Minister for Police, Emergency Services and Correctional Services in the Malinauskas ministry since March 2022.

Early life
Szakacs was born in Adelaide to a Hungarian father and Australian mother. He attended St Michael's College, Adelaide. In his teens, Szakacs was a competitive swimmer, holding the state 50m freestyle title and representing Australia at the 2002–03 FINA Swimming World Cup. He won swimming scholarships to the South Australian Institute of Sport and the University of Missouri, then returned to Australia to study law at Flinders University.

Introduced to the trade union movement by his father, a waterside worker in Port Adelaide, Szakacs worked as a volunteer lawyer at the Young Workers Legal Service, then as an industrial officer with the Australian Manufacturing Workers Union and later the United Firefighters Union South Australia. In October 2013, he was elected as state secretary of SA Unions.

Political career
Szakacs was elected to the South Australian House of Assembly in the by-election for the seat of Cheltenham on 9 February 2019, replacing former premier Jay Weatherill.

After Labor won the 2022 state election, Szakacs was appointed as the Minister for Police, Emergency Services and Correctional Services in the Malinauskas ministry.

References

1982 births
Living people
Australian Labor Party members of the Parliament of South Australia
Members of the South Australian House of Assembly
Australian trade unionists
Australian male freestyle swimmers
Australian people of Hungarian descent
Flinders University alumni
University of Missouri alumni
South Australian Sports Institute alumni
21st-century Australian politicians